Samira Fazal is a Pakistani author and screenwriter. She is best known for writing the scripts for the dramas Dastaan, Vasl, Khamoshiyan, Bari Aapa, and Mera Naseeb for which she earned a Lux Style Award for best TV Writer 2012.

Dramas and plays
Samira Fazal's works include:

 Alvida
 Badi Aapa
 Band Khirkyon Kay Peechay
 Chup Raho
 Dastaan, (Scripted for TV of Razia Butt one of 4 Famous Feminist Novel Bano)
 Mera Naseeb
 Mera Saaein
 Manay Na Ye Dil
 Mastana Mahi
 Mere Paas Paas & Mere Paas Paas Sequel,
 Meri Unsuni Kahani
 Milay Kuch Yun
 Mastana Mahi
 Millee Ali Ko Mili
 Noor Pur Ki Rani
 Vasal
 Sanjha
 Silvatein
 Meri Jaan
 Khamoshyaan.
 Teri Surat
 Tum Say Kaisay Kahoon
 Mujhey Sochta Koi Aur Hai
 Mohabbatain Chahatein
 Mann Mayal
 Aitraaz
 Woh Aik Pal
 Mohlat

Awards and nominations

Awards
 Best Writer Most Challenging Subject Awards for Dastaan at 1st Hum Awards 2012 (won)

 Best Writer Drama Serial for Bari Aapa at 1st Hum Awards 2012 (nominated)

Lux Style Awards

References

External links 

 Facebook page
 

 
Living people
1976 births
Television series written by Samira Fazal
People from Sialkot
Pakistani women writers
Pakistani novelists
Hum Award winners
Pakistani dramatists and playwrights
Pakistani screenwriters
Lux Style Award winners
Pakistani women novelists